Bas van der Kooij (born 16 November 1995) is a Dutch professional racing cyclist, who most recently rode for UCI Continental team .

Major results

2016
 4th Road race, National Under-23 Road Championships
2018
 3rd Fyen Rundt
 3rd Antwerpse Havenpijl
 4th Arnhem–Veenendaal Classic
 6th PWZ Zuidenveld Tour
 7th Circuit de Wallonie
 8th Road race, National Road Championships
2019
 1st De Kustpijl
 Tour of Antalya
1st  Points classification
1st Stage 2
 2nd PWZ Zuidenveld Tour
 3rd Road race, National Road Championships
 3rd Himmerland Rundt
 4th Overall Paris–Arras Tour
 4th Arno Wallaard Memorial
 5th Skive–Løbet
 7th Rutland–Melton CiCLE Classic
2020
 5th Dorpenomloop Rucphen
2021
 9th Gooikse Pijl

References

External links

1995 births
Living people
Dutch male cyclists
People from De Ronde Venen
Cyclists from Utrecht (province)